Jokela railway station is located along the Finnish Main Line in Tuusula, Finland, 48 km to the north of Helsinki Central railway station. It is situated between the stations of Nuppulinna and Hyvinkää

The station serves the R and T commuter rail lines between Helsinki and the Riihimäki terminus to the north.

The station was the scene of the Jokela rail accident (pictured) on 21 April 1996, in which four people were killed after a train derailed in heavy fog.

References

External links 
 

Tuusula
Railway stations in Uusimaa